Rojhuwas is a village in Jatusana Tehsil in Rewari district of Haryana, India. It belongs to Gurgaon division.

123401 is its pincode and postal head office is Tehsil Road Rewari. Rohrai, Parkhotampur, Musepur, Gopalpur Gazi, Haluhera are the nearby villages to Rojhuwas.

References 

Villages in Rewari district